Parliamentary elections were held in the Czech Republic on 31 May and 1 June 1996, the first after independence. The result was a victory for the Civic Democratic Party, which won 68 of the 200 seats. Voter turnout was 76.3%.

Campaign
The campaign was primarily a conflict between the right-wing ODS and left-wing ČSSD. The ODS used slogans "Freedom and Prosperity" and "We proved that we can." ČSSD used slogan "Humanity against selfishness." ČSSD used an autobus called "Zemák" during its campaign. Party's leader Miloš Zeman campaigned with it at multiple places over the Czech Republic. ODS on the other hand used endorsements of public celebrities such as Lucie Bílá. Both parties used meetings with voters as their campaign instrument.

Finances

Opinion polls

Results

References

Czech
1996 elections in the Czech Republic
1996
May 1996 events in Europe
June 1996 events in Europe